Bohdan Ihor Antonych (5 October 1909, in Nowica – 6 July 1937, in Lviv) was a 20th-century Ukrainian poet. In 1934 Antonych received third prize honours from the Ivan Franko Society of Writers and Journalists for his work Three Signet Rings.

Biography

Antonych was born and raised in the Lemko village of Nowica where his father, Vasyl, was a parish priest. In 1928 Antonych left Nowica to study at Lviv University, where he remained until he received his degree in Slavic studies in 1933. In order to help finance his chosen career of professional writer, he occasionally worked as an editor for journals such as Dazhboh and Karby. Antonych died from pneumonia on 6 July 1937. In October 2009, the National Bank of Ukraine issued a commemorative coin in his honor as a part of their "Outstanding Personalities of Ukraine" series.

In his poetry he combines the principles of imagism with a life-affirming paganism inspired by Lemko folklore. He declared himself "a pagan in love with life" and "a poet of spring intoxication".

Selected works
 Autobiography (Автобіографія)
 The Green Gospel (Зелена Євангелія). Lviv, 1938
 Book of the Lion (Книга Лева). Lviv, 1936;
 На другому березі (unfinished)
 Welcome to Life [Привітання життя]. Lviv, 1931;
 Song on the Indestructibility of Matter (Пісня про незнищенність матерії)
 Rotations (Ротації). Lviv, 1938.
 Three Rings (Три перстені). Lviv, 1934;
 Ukrainian translations of Rainer Maria Rilke's works

Further reading
The Essential Poetry of Bohdan Ihor Antonych: Ecstasies and Elegies. Bohdan-Ihor Antonych, Michael M. Naydan. (Bucknell University Press, 2010) 
The Grand Harmony. Bohdan-Ihor Antonych, Translated by Michael M. Naydan. (Glagoslav Publications, 2017)

References

External links
 Antonych's works in audio format

1909 births
1937 deaths
People from Gorlice County
People from the Kingdom of Galicia and Lodomeria
Lemkos
Ukrainian male poets
Ukrainian editors
20th-century poets
Ukrainian people of Rusyn descent
Ukrainian modern pagans
Modern pagan poets
Burials at Yaniv Cemetery